Cyrtometopus is an extinct genus of trilobite in the order Phacopida.

Species 
 Cyrtometopus affinis
 Cyrtometopus clavifrons
 Cyrtometopus meridianus
 Cyrtometopus sembnitzkii

External links

 Cyrtometopus at the Paleobiology Database
 Cochise College trilobite listing
 The Back to the Past Museum Guide to TRILOBITES

Cheiruridae
Extinct animals of Europe
Ordovician trilobites
Phacopida genera